Surendra is an Indian masculine given name. Notable people with this name include:
 Surendra (actor/singer)
 Surendra Bhave
 Surendra Chaturvedi
 Surendra Dubey
 Surendra Gambhir
 Surendra Hiranandani
 Surendra Jain
 Surendra Jha 'Suman'
 Surendra Kumar Datta
 Surendra Kumar Sinha
 Surendra Lal
 Surendra Lath
 Surendra Mishra
 Surendra Mohanty
 Surendra Motilal Patel
 Surendra Nath Mitra
 Surendra Nath
 Surendra of Nepal
 Surendra Pal
 Surendra Pandey
 Surendra Poonia
 Surendra Prakash Goyal
 Surendra Ramachandran
 Surendra Sai
 Surendra Seeraj
 Surendra Sheodas Barlingay
 Surendra Singh (disambiguation), several people
 Surendra Verma (science writer)
 Surendra Verma

See also
 Surendra Institute of Engineering & Management
 Surinder, another given name

Indian masculine given names